Jack Haskett (25 June 1911 – 5 March 1992) was an  Australian rules footballer who played with North Melbourne in the Victorian Football League (VFL).

Notes

External links 

1911 births
1992 deaths
Australian rules footballers from Victoria (Australia)
North Melbourne Football Club players